Daniels is a patronymic surname meaning "son of Daniel". 
  People with the name or its variants include:

Disambiguation pages
Alan Daniels (disambiguation)
Anthony Daniels (disambiguation)
Brian Daniels (disambiguation)
Carrie Daniels (disambiguation)
Charles Daniels (disambiguation)
Charles N. Daniels (disambiguation)
Charlie Daniels (disambiguation)
David Daniels (disambiguation)
George Daniels (disambiguation)
Jack Daniels (disambiguation)
Jeffrey Daniels (disambiguation)
Joe Daniels (disambiguation)
John Daniels (disambiguation)
Jonathan Daniels (disambiguation)
Lisa Daniels (disambiguation)
Mike Daniels (disambiguation)
Peter Daniels (disambiguation)
Raymond Daniels (disambiguation)
Robin Daniels (disambiguation)
Ronald Daniels (disambiguation)
Scott Daniels (disambiguation)
Shawn Daniels (disambiguation)
William Daniels (disambiguation)

Surname

Arts, media, and literature
Alyssa Daniels, American web designer
Annette Daniels, American mezzo-soprano opera singer
Anthony Daniels, English actor best known for playing C-3PO in Star Wars
Bebe Daniels, American actress
Ben Daniels, English actor who has won a Laurence Olivier Theatre Award
Billy Daniels, American big band singer and actor
Chad Daniels, comedian
Charles Daniels (tenor), English classical singer
Charles N. Daniels, American songwriter who composed under the pseudonym Neil Moret
Charlie Daniels, American country music singer and musician
Cora Linn Daniels (1852-?), American author
Danny Daniels, American choreographer, tap dancer, and teacher
David Daniels (countertenor) (born 1966), American operatic singer and countertenor
David Daniels (poet), visual poet
David Karsten Daniels, American songwriter and musician
David Daniels (film), filmmaker
Eddie Daniels, American musician
Erin Daniels, American actress
Faith Daniels, American television news anchor and talk-show host
Frank Daniels, actor in early black and white films
Greg Daniels, television comedy writer
Jeff Daniels, American actor
Jeffrey Daniels (author), American author
Jesse Daniels, American sculptor and musician
Jessie Daniels, American actress, songwriter, and Christian musician
Jim Daniels, American poet and writer
Josephus Daniels, American diplomat, 41st United States Secretary of the Navy
Kevin Daniels, American actor
LaShawn Daniels, American songwriter
Leonard Daniels, British artist
Lee Daniels, American film and television writer, director and producer
Les Daniels, American writer of literary criticism, cultural studies and historical horror fiction
Marc Daniels, American television director
Mark Daniels, American architect, landscape architect, and civil engineer
Martin Daniels, English magician and entertainer
Mickey Daniels, American child actor
Misty Daniels, American stage actress
Owen Daniels, American actor
Paul Daniels (1938–2016), British stage magician
Phil Daniels, English actor
Rik Daniëls, Belgian television director
Rod Daniels, retired American television news anchor
Ross Daniels, Australian actor and comedian
Roy Daniells, Canadian poetry professor
Sarah Daniels (playwright), British dramatist
Spencer Daniels, American actor
Stormy Daniels, American actress, screenwriter, and director
Traa Daniels, bassist of southern California rock band P.O.D.
William Daniels, American actor
William Daniels (artist), British artist
William H. Daniels, film cinematographer best known as Greta Garbo's personal lensman

Politics
Charles Daniels (New York politician), U.S. Representative from New York
Fletcher Daniels, American politician
Jack Daniels (politician), New Mexico politician and the head of an insurance agency
John C. Daniels, mayor of New Haven, Connecticut
Jonathan W. Daniels, shortest-serving White House Press Secretary
Josephus Daniels, American politician and newspaper publisher
Geraldine L. Daniels (1933–2012), New York politician
Lee A. Daniels, Illinois State Representative
Mitch Daniels, Governor of the state of Indiana
Randy Daniels, Secretary of State of New York
Ronald Daniels, third-party candidate in the 1992 U.S. presidential election

Science, math, and medicine
Anthony Daniels (psychiatrist), English writer and retired physician
Farrington Daniels, pioneer of the modern direct use of solar energy
Henry Daniels, British statistician
Patricia Daniels, American engineering educator
William Daniels (automotive engineer), British car engineer

Sport
Aidan Daniels, Canadian soccer player
Antonio Daniels, American professional basketball player 
Arthur Daniels, dual code rugby player
Barney Daniels, English footballer
Bert Daniels, American professional baseball player
Carl Daniels, professional boxer in the Light Middleweight division
Charles Daniels (swimmer), American freestyle swimmer
Charles F. Daniels, American baseball umpire
Christopher Daniels, American professional wrestler, best known as "The Fallen Angel"
Clem Daniels, American college and professional football player
Darrell Daniels, American football player
Darrion Daniels (born 1997), American football player
David Daniels (basketball), Canadian basketball player
Djenairo Daniels (born 2002), Dutch footballer
Dominic Daniels, South African cricketer
Dyson Daniels (born 2003), American basketball player
Erik Daniels, American professional basketball player
Gary Daniels, British born kickboxer, martial artist, and martial arts actor
Gipsy Daniels, Welsh boxer
Isabelle Daniels, American Olympic athlete
Jack Daniels (baseball), Major League Baseball player
Jack Daniels (coach), professor of physical education and cross-country running coach
Jake Daniels, English footballer 
Jalon Daniels (born 1995), American football player
James Daniels, American football player
Jayson Daniels, Australian rules footballer
Jeff Daniels (ice hockey), professional ice hockey player
Jon Daniels, American baseball manager
JT Daniels (born 2000), American football player
Kahzin Daniels (born 1995), American football player
Kal Daniels, Major League Baseball outfielder
Ken Daniels, sports announcer
Kimbi Daniels, professional hockey player
Law Daniels, major league baseball player
Lloyd Daniels, American former professional basketball player
Luke Daniels, English footballer
Marquis Daniels, basketball player
Mel Daniels, American former professional basketball player
Owen Daniels, American football tight end
Phillip Daniels, American football defensive end
P. J. Daniels, college running back
Raymond Daniels (martial artist), American martial artist
Robert Daniels, professional boxer in the Cruiserweight division
Silas Daniels, professional American football wide receiver
Torrance Daniels, American football linebacker
Travis Daniels, American football player
Troy Daniels, American basketball player

Other
Arthur Grosvenor Daniells, Seventh-day Adventist minister and administrator
Edler von Daniels, German field general who fought in the Battle of Stalingrad
Harry Daniels, English recipient of the Victoria Cross
Jonathan Myrick Daniels, Episcopal seminarian, killed for his work in the American civil rights movement
Michael Daniels, British transpersonal psychologist and parapsychologist
Robert V. Daniels (1926-2010), historian of Russia
Tiffany Daniels, American woman missing from her Florida home since 2013

Fictional characters
Cedric Daniels, on the HBO TV drama The Wire
Chelsea Daniels, on the Disney Channel sitcom That's So Raven
Crewman Daniels, from Star Trek: Enterprise
David Daniels, a character from The Mummy 
Helen Daniels, in the Australian soap opera Neighbours
Noah Daniels, from the FOX TV series 24
Rosemary Daniels, in the Australian soap opera Neighbours
Tug Daniels, in the HBO prison drama Oz

See also

References 

English-language surnames
Patronymic surnames
Surnames from given names